Superman: The Complete Comic Strips 1939-1966  is an unofficial umbrella name for the six following titles: Superman: The Golden Age Dailies, Superman: The Golden Age Sundays; Superman: The Atomic Age Dailies, Superman: The Atomic Age Sundays; Superman: The Silver Age Dailies and Superman: The Silver Age Sundays, all published by The Library of American Comics. These six series of books collects the complete run of the American comic strip Superman by DC Comics, which was originally distributed in newspapers by the McClure Syndicate between 1939 and 1966.

Background

In 1998 and 1999 Kitchen Sink Press and DC Comics published hardcover collections, one each of the first years of the daily, and the first years of the Sunday Superman comic strip. Kitchen Sink went out of business the same year, after nearly thirty years in business.

After several years of prior negotiations between Greg Goldstein of IDW Publishing and DC Comics with the goal of getting the reprinting rights to the Superman, Batman and Wonder Woman comic strips,  a deal was struck in 2013 to finally include them in The Library of American Comics' line of reprint collections.
The IDW books do not feature any of the strips reprinted by Kitchen Sink in their two volumes (Superman dailies 1939–42, Superman Sundays 1939–43), and thus pick up where they left off.

Superman comic strip collector Sidney Friedfertig, who contributed much the source material to these LOAC book series, had succeeded in collecting 97 percent of the daily strips in newspaper clippings from 1959 to 1966 and published it online at his own website in 2012. Since most of these clippings are in good publishable condition, compared to what have been available on microform in libraries, the clippings are far more suitable as source material for reproduction. After Friedfertig's publication of the comic strip on his website he was approached by IDW Publishing and The Library of American Comics about publishing the material he had collected in their upcoming Superman comic strip collections. Friedfertig's accomplishment was very substantial since the original proofs of the Superman daily strips were never archived by DC Comics after their initial publication, therefore there are no originals available.

In December 2015 The Library of American Comics reached out to comic collectors worldwide to acquire missing strips which they themselves had trouble locating, to use as source material for the books.

Format

Volumes collecting dailies

Landscape orientation, 11 inches × 8.5 inches (280 mm × 216 mm), hardcover with sewn ribbon bookmark, Contains approximately 700-800 daily strips each, arranged three per page, reproduced in original black-and-white.

The daily strips are divided into three sub sets collections, one for each decade: The Golden Age - The 1940s, The Atomic Age - The 1950s and The Silver Age - The 1960s.

Introductions featuring information about the creators, comparison and analysis of the storylines from the comic strips and the comic books. Some of the material used to reproduce the strips have been sourced from comic collectors newspaper clippings collections, therefore some art is not engraver's proof pristine, but can have noticeable smudging, however this is the best reproduction to date. Essays written by Sidney Friedfertig are included in the volumes.

Volumes collecting Sundays

Porttrait orientation, 9.25 inches × 12 inches (235 mm × 305 mm), hardcover with clear art reproductions, in sharp full color and with a sewn linen bookmark.

The Sunday strips run is divided into three sub-sets:1940s - Golden Age, 1950s - Atomic Age and 1960s - Silver Age, just as the daily strips also are collected.

Introductions written by Mark Waid and John Wells, pinpointing many of the featured storylines and other noteworthy facts. Each Sunday strip has the annotated original strip number and first publishing date noted. The Reproduction size is slightly smaller than the original Sunday paper sizing. Cover art, both front and back have been drawn by Pete Poplaski. Galleries of comic book covers done by the newspar strips' artists are included.

Volumes

Golden Age - The 1940s

{| class="wikitable sortable"
|+ style="background-color:#B0C4DE" | The Golden Age Newspaper Dailies
|-
! style="background-color:#D0E4FE" data-sort-type="number" | Volume 
! style="background-color:#D0E4FE" | Release date
! style="background-color:#D0E4FE" | Title
! style="background-color:#D0E4FE" | Period
! style="background-color:#D0E4FE" | Artist
! style="background-color:#D0E4FE" | Writer
| style="background-color:#D0E4FE" | Page count
! style="background-color:#D0E4FE" | ISBN
|-
|1||2017-04-01||Superman:Golden Age Dailies - Vol. 1: 1942-1944||1942–1944||Joe ShusterWayne Boring||Jerry SiegelWhitney Ellsworth||288||
|-
|2||2018-05-22||Superman:Golden Age Dailies - Vol. 2: 1944-1947||1944–1947||Wayne Boring||Alvin Schwartz||272||
|-
|3||2019-05-21||Superman:Golden Age Dailies - Vol. 3: 1947-1949||1947–1949||Wayne Boring||Alvin Schwartz||260||
|}

{| class="wikitable sortable"
|+ style="background-color:#B0C4DE" | The Golden Age Sundays
|-
! style="background-color:#D0E4FE" data-sort-type="number" | Volume
! style="background-color:#D0E4FE" | Release date
! style="background-color:#D0E4FE" | Title
! style="background-color:#D0E4FE" | Period
! style="background-color:#D0E4FE" | Artist
! style="background-color:#D0E4FE" | Writer
| style="background-color:#D0E4FE" | Page count
! style="background-color:#D0E4FE" | ISBN
|-
|1||2014-02-11||Superman:Golden Age Sundays - Vol. 1: 1943-1946||1943–1946||||||184||
|-
|2||2014-11-18||Superman:Golden Age Sundays - Vol. 2: 1946-1949||1946–1949||Wayne Boring||Jerry SiegelAlvin Schwartz||180||
|-
|}

Atomic Age - The 1950s

{| class="wikitable sortable"
|+ style="background-color:#B0C4DE" | The Atomic Age Newspaper Dailies
|-
! style="background-color:#D0E4FE" data-sort-type="number" | Volume 
! style="background-color:#D0E4FE" | Release date
! style="background-color:#D0E4FE" | Title
! style="background-color:#D0E4FE" | Period
! style="background-color:#D0E4FE" | Artist
! style="background-color:#D0E4FE" | Writer
| style="background-color:#D0E4FE" | Page count
! style="background-color:#D0E4FE" | ISBN
|-
|1||TBA||Superman: Atomic Age Dailies - Vol. 1||TBA||TBA||TBA||TBA||xxx-x-xxxxx-xxx-x
|-
|}

{| class="wikitable sortable"
|+ style="background-color:#B0C4DE" | The Atomic Age Sundays
|-
! style="background-color:#D0E4FE" data-sort-type="number" | Volume 
! style="background-color:#D0E4FE" | Release date
! style="background-color:#D0E4FE" | Title
! style="background-color:#D0E4FE" | Period
! style="background-color:#D0E4FE" | Artist
! style="background-color:#D0E4FE" | Writer
| style="background-color:#D0E4FE" | Page count
! style="background-color:#D0E4FE" | ISBN
|-
|1||2015-07-28||Superman:Atomic Age Sundays - Vol. 1: 1949-1953||1949–1953||Wayne Boring||Alvin Schwartz||180||
|-
|2||2016-04-05||Superman:Atomic Age Sundays - Vol. 2: 1953-1956||1953–1956||Wayne Boring||Alvin Schwartz||180||
|-
|3||2017-12-26||Superman:Atomic Age Sundays - Vol. 3: 1956-1959||1956–1959||Wayne Boring||Alvin SchwartzBill Finger||184||
|-
|}

Silver Age - The 1960s

{| class="wikitable sortable"
|+ style="background-color:#B0C4DE" | The Silver Age Newspaper Dailies
|-
! style="background-color:#D0E4FE" data-sort-type="number" | Volume 
! style="background-color:#D0E4FE" | Release date
! style="background-color:#D0E4FE" | Title
! style="background-color:#D0E4FE" | Period
! style="background-color:#D0E4FE" | Artist
! style="background-color:#D0E4FE" | Writer
| style="background-color:#D0E4FE" | Page count
! style="background-color:#D0E4FE" | ISBN
|-
|1||2013-08-13||Superman:Silver Age Dailies - Vol. 1: 1959–1961||1959–1961||Curt SwanStan KayeWayne Boring||Jerry Siegel||288||
|-
|2||2014-04-29||Superman:Silver Age Dailies - Vol. 2: 1961-1963||1961–1963||Wayne Boring||Jerry Siegel||288||
|-
|3||2014-12-23||Superman:Silver Age Dailies - Vol. 3: 1963-1966||1963–1966||Wayne Boring||Jerry Siegel||288||
|-
|}

{| class="wikitable sortable"
|+ style="background-color:#B0C4DE" | The Silver Age Sundays
|-
! style="background-color:#D0E4FE" data-sort-type="number" | Volume 
! style="background-color:#D0E4FE" | Release date
! style="background-color:#D0E4FE" | Title
! style="background-color:#D0E4FE" | Period
! style="background-color:#D0E4FE" | Artist
! style="background-color:#D0E4FE" | Writer
| style="background-color:#D0E4FE" | Page count
! style="background-color:#D0E4FE" | ISBN
|-
|1||2018-11-27||Superman:Silver Age Sundays - Vol. 1: 1959-1963||1959–1963||Wayne Boring||Jerry Siegel||184||
|-
|2||2019-11-19||Superman:Silver Age Sundays - Vol. 2: 1963-1966||1963–1966||Wayne Boring||Jerry Siegel||184||
|-
|}

References

External links 

 IDW Publishing - The Library of American Comics - Superman
 Preview - Superman: Golden Age Sundays - Vol. 2: 1946-1949

Comic strip collection books
Superman in other media
The Library of American Comics publications
Superman titles